Mitogen-activated protein kinase kinase kinase kinase 5 is an enzyme that in humans is encoded by the MAP4K5 gene.

This gene encodes a member of the serine/threonine protein kinase family, that is highly similar to yeast SPS1/STE20 kinase. Yeast SPS1/STE20 functions near the beginning of the MAP kinase signal cascades that is essential for yeast pheromone response. This kinase was shown to activate Jun kinase in mammalian cells, which suggested a role in stress response. Two alternatively spliced transcript variants encoding the same protein have been described for this gene.

Interactions
MAP4K5 has been shown to interact with CRKL and TRAF2.

References

Further reading